Les Éditions Doberman-Yppan (Doberman-Yppan) is a Canadian music publishing firm. The company's headquarters is based in Lévis, Quebec. The publishing company was acquired in 2010 by Canadian publisher Les Productions d’OZ.

Notable publications
Prelude and Fugue by Marc-André Hamelin
Concerto for Guitar and string orchestra by Jacques Hétu
Suite pour guitare by Jacques Hétu
Works of Welsh composer Stephen Goss
All published arrangements by David Russell
More than 125 guitar works by Roland Dyens
Many recent works by Sergio Assad

External links
 Les Éditions Doberman-Yppan - Official site

Music publishing companies of Canada
Sheet music publishing companies
Companies based in Lévis, Quebec